Peter Whittle may refer to:

Peter Whittle (politician) (born 1961), former deputy leader of the United Kingdom Independence Party
Peter Whittle (mathematician) (1927–2021), mathematician and statistician